Leonora LaPeter Anton is an American journalist with the Tampa Bay Times.  Anton was a co-recipient of the 2016 Pulitzer Prize for Investigative Reporting.

Biography
Anton grew up in Connecticut, but spent a lot of her childhood living in Greece, where her mother was an archeologist and Fulbright Scholar.  She studied journalism at University of Illinois at Urbana–Champaign.

Anton began her career writing for the Okeechobee News in Okeechobee, Florida.  In 1992, she was hired at The Island Packet in Hilton Head Island, South Carolina, where she covered environmental and health care topics.  Anton then worked at the Tallahassee Democrat in Tallahassee, Florida, and Savannah Morning News in Savannah, Georgia.

In 2000, Anton joined the Tampa Bay Times.  That same year, she won the American Society of News Editors award for deadline reporting.

Anton was awarded the Pulitzer Prize for Investigative Reporting in 2016 for a series entitled "Insane. Invisible. In Danger," published in the Tampa Bay Times and Sarasota Herald-Tribune. The series, co-authored by Michael Braga and Anthony Cormier, unveiled the violence and neglect taking place at state-funded mental hospitals in the state of Florida.

Personal life
Anton lives in St. Petersburg, Florida with her husband Larry and one daughter.

References

Year of birth missing (living people)
Living people
American newspaper writers
Pulitzer Prize for Investigative Reporting winners
University of Illinois Urbana-Champaign College of Media alumni
People from Okeechobee, Florida
People from St. Petersburg, Florida
Journalists from Florida
Journalists from Connecticut
20th-century American journalists
20th-century American women writers
21st-century American journalists
21st-century American women writers